Devon cattle may refer to:

South Devon cattle
North Devon cattle
American Milking Devon